Bonolis is an Italian surname. Notable people with the name include:

Giuseppe Bonolis (1800–1851), Italian painter
Paolo Bonolis (born 1961), Italian television presenter

See also
Stadio Gaetano Bonolis, multi-use stadium in Teramo, Italy

Italian-language surnames